The Canal de Pont-de-Vaux is a canal in eastern France connecting the Saône at Fleurville to Pont-de-Vaux.  It was closed for many years and reopened in 1993. It runs parallel to the Reyssouze River.

See also
 List of canals in France

References

External links
 Project Babel

Pont-de-Vaux
Canals opened in 1827
1827 establishments in France